James Benjamin Sclater, Jr. (1847-1882) was a founder of Pi Kappa Alpha Fraternity.

Biography
Sclater was born in Orange County, Virginia, on July 19, 1847, the son of James Benjamin Sclater, Sr. and Harriet (Wharton) Sclater. Soon after his birth, his father moved to Richmond, where, for many years, he was in the general mercantile 
brokerage business.  Sclater briefly attended the Cabell School in the Virginia Piedmont and in March 1864 he entered the Virginia Military Institute when that institution had been moved from Lexington to Richmond, and where the cadets were in 
active war service in the defense of Richmond. In April 1865, Sclater was paroled from the Cadet Battalion by order of Union Army officers, after Lee's army had evacuated Richmond.

Sclater entered the University of Virginia, where he remained for two years. Although he was later known to his friends as "Doc," he did not receive a degree in medicine at the University and never practiced that profession. He did, however, devote 
much of his time to his medical studies and is recorded as having done distinguished work. He lived in Room 47, which he shared with another Pi Kappa Alpha founder, Robertson Howard. For a time he engaged in the drug business in Charlotte, North Carolina. He then settled in Richmond, and the directory of that city lists him as a clerk, presumably in his father's business, from 1870 until his death in 1882. During these years he was in declining health and his untimely death occurred at the age of 35. Sclater became the first of the founders of Pi Kappa Alpha to die.  

Although unmarried, he left behind a sweetheart who remained loyal to his memory through the years that followed. Sclater was survived by no close relatives other than his father who would die seven years after his son.  Sclater lies in Hollywood Cemetery, 
Richmond, Virginia, on a beautiful knoll overlooking the James River. His grave was for a long time marked only by an ornamental urn placed there by his sweetheart.

References
http://www.pka.org

1847 births
1882 deaths
University of Virginia alumni
Burials at Hollywood Cemetery (Richmond, Virginia)
Pi Kappa Alpha founders
People from Orange County, Virginia